Vinland Saga is a Japanese manga series written and illustrated by Makoto Yukimura, published by Kodansha. The series focuses on Thorfinn, a young viking who wishes to avenge his father, Thors, who was killed by his current superior, Askeladd. The manga began serialization in April 2005 in the shōnen manga magazine Weekly Shōnen Magazine. In December 2005, it moved to the monthly seinen manga magazine Monthly Afternoon. The first two volumes were initially released under the Shōnen Magazine Comics imprint, and then reissued under the Afternoon KC imprint after the manga's serialization switch. As of July 2021, the chapters have been collected in twenty-five tankōbon volumes.

In North America, the series is licensed for English release by Kodansha USA. It is being published in a two-in-one hardcover book edition and the first volume was released on October 14, 2013. As of December 20, 2022, thirteen volumes have been released.



Volume list

Chapters not yet in tankōbon format
These chapters have yet to be published in a tankōbon volume:

192. 
193. 
194. 
195. 
196. 
197. 
198. 
199.

References

External links
  

Vinland Saga